Mark Groudine is an American radiation oncologist currently at Fred Hutchinson Cancer Research Center, a member of the National Academy of Sciences and an Elected Fellow of the American Association for the Advancement of Science and American Academy of Arts and Sciences. He also served on the Life Sciences jury for the Infosys Prize in 2015.

References

Year of birth missing (living people)
Living people
Fellows of the American Association for the Advancement of Science
University of Washington faculty
American oncologists
Fellows of the American Academy of Arts and Sciences
Members of the United States National Academy of Sciences
Members of the National Academy of Medicine
Fred Hutchinson Cancer Research Center people